Conus orion, common name the Orion cone, is a species of sea snail, a marine gastropod mollusk in the family Conidae, the cone snails and their allies.

Like all species within the genus Conus, these snails are predatory and venomous. They are capable of "stinging" humans, therefore live ones should be handled carefully or not at all.

Description
The size of the shell varies between 17 mm and 32 mm. The broader shell is angular at the shoulder. The color of the shell is dark brown with maculated white bands and rather continuous revolving lines of darker brown. The spire is convex and maculated with chestnut.

Distribution
This species occurs in the Pacific Ocean between Mexico and Colombia.

References

 Schwengel, J. S. 1955. Nautilus. 69 (1): 13, plate 2, figure 1-7
 Filmer R.M. (2001). A Catalogue of Nomenclature and Taxonomy in the Living Conidae 1758–1998. Backhuys Publishers, Leiden. 388pp
 Tenorio M.J., Tucker J.K. & Chaney H.W. (2012) The families Conilithidae and Conidae. The cones of the Eastern Pacific. In: G.T. Poppe & K. Groh (eds), A conchological iconography. Hackenheim: Conchbooks.
 Puillandre N., Duda T.F., Meyer C., Olivera B.M. & Bouchet P. (2015). One, four or 100 genera? A new classification of the cone snails. Journal of Molluscan Studies. 81: 1–23

External links
 The Conus Biodiversity website
 Cone Shells - Knights of the Sea
 

orion
Gastropods described in 1833
Taxa named by William Broderip